This is a list of slums in Peru.

Comas
Villa El Salvador
San Juan de Lurigancho
Cono Sur
all around panamerican highway naming as examples : ica / cañete / Nueva cañete / chilca  chincha and also near pucusana and Asia

 outskirts of cusco

See also

 List of slums

Slums
Peru

Slums